The Summa Parisiensis is an anonymous commentary on the Decretum Gratiani from about 1170.

The Decretum Gratiani or Concordia discordantium canonum is a collection of Catholic Church Canon law compiled and written in the 12th century as a legal textbook by the jurist known as Gratian.

Notes

References 

The “Summa Parisiensis” on the “Decretum Gratiani”, ed. T. McLaughlin, Toronto 1952.

Documents of the Catholic Church
1170 in Europe
1170
12th century in law
12th-century Christian texts